Thomas Garland Jefferson (January 1, 1847 – May 18, 1864) was one of the VMI Cadets killed at the Battle of New Market. He died three days after the battle from wounds suffered during it. He was 17 years old and the great-grand nephew of former US president Thomas Jefferson.

Early years
He was a son of John Garland Jefferson and Otelia Mansfield Howlett of Winterham. He was their oldest son, one of 14 children, on a plantation growing cotton and tobacco.

New Market
On May 15, 1864, at the Battle of New Market,  Major General John C. Breckinridge reluctantly ordered the charge of the young cadets to fill a gap in his right wing, resulting in the cadets having taken part in the Confederacy's last major victory of the war. The cadet battalion captured a Union cannon.

Jefferson was shot in the stomach. When two cadets ran to assist him, he told them to carry on fighting, "you can do me no good." He died three days later, in the bed at the home of Lydie Clinedinst, after he was found by Moses Ezekiel wounded and laying in a farmhouse. Ezekiel (who was Jewish) read from John 14 by his bedside. He is buried below the statue of Virginia Mourning Her Dead sculpted by Ezekiel.

References

1847 births
1864 deaths
New Market cadets
People from Amelia County, Virginia
Virginia Military Institute alumni
Confederate States of America military personnel killed in the American Civil War
Child soldiers in the American Civil War
Jefferson family
People of Virginia in the American Civil War